Al Kurumik is a district of Blue Nile state, Sudan.

References

Districts of Sudan